Ke Jiusi (c. 1290 – 1343) was a Chinese landscape painter, calligrapher, and poet during the Yuan Dynasty (1271–1368).

Ke was born in the Zhejiang province. His style name was 'Jingzhong' (敬仲) and his pseudonyms were 'Dan qiusheng' (丹丘生) and 'Wuyun geli' (五云阁吏). Ke's painting followed the style of Wen Tong, utilizing bold and delicate brush strokes in a composed atmosphere. Ke's poetry included The Collection of Dan Qiushen (丹丘生集).

Notes

References
 Barnhart, R. M. et al. (1997). Three thousand years of Chinese painting. New Haven, Yale University Press. 
 Ci hai bian ji wei yuan hui (辞海编辑委员会). Ci hai  (辞海). Shanghai: Shanghai ci shu chu ban she  (上海辞书出版社), 1979.

1290 births
1343 deaths
Painters from Zhejiang
Yuan dynasty landscape painters
People from Taizhou, Zhejiang